Nanna, Sīn  or Suen, and in Aramaic syn, syn’, or even shr 'moon', or Nannar was the god of the moon in the Mesopotamian religions of Sumer, Akkad, Assyria, Babylonia and Aram. He was also associated with cattle, perhaps due to the perceived similarity between bull horns and the crescent moon. He was always described as a major deity, though only a few sources, mostly these from the reign of Nabonidus, consider him to be the head of the Mesopotamian pantheon.

The two chief seats of his worship were Ur in the south of Mesopotamia and Harran in the north, though he was also worshiped in numerous other cities, especially in the proximity of Ur and in the Diyala area. In Ur, he was connected to royal power, and many Mesopotamian kings visited his temple in this city.

According to Mesopotamian mythology, his parents were Enlil and Ninlil, while his wife was Ningal, worshiped with him in his major cult centers. Their children included major deities Innanna (Ishtar) and Utu (Shamash) and minor gods such as Ningublaga and Numushda. Some deities, for example Nanaya and Pinikir, were sometimes regarded as his children due to syncretism between them and his daughter Ishtar. Nanna acquired a number of syncretic associations himself, and the logographic writings of his name were used to represent these of other moon gods, such as Ugaritic Yarikh or Hurrian Kusuh.

Name 
The original meaning of the Sumerian name Nanna is unknown. The earliest spelling found in Ur and Uruk is DLAK-32.NA (where NA is to be understood as a phonetic complement). The name of Ur, spelled LAK-32.UNUGKI=URIM2KI, is itself derived from the theonym, and means "the abode (UNUG) of Nanna (LAK-32)". The pre-classical sign LAK-32 later collapses with ŠEŠ (the ideogram for "brother"), and the classical Sumerian spelling is DŠEŠ.KI, with the phonetic reading na-an-na. The technical term for the crescent moon could also refer to the deity, ( DU4.SAKAR). Later, the name was spelled logographically as DNANNA.

The spelling Nannar (dNa-an-na-ra,  DNANNA-ar DSuen-e), known both from Mesopotamian sources and from an inscription of the Elamite king Shilhak-Inshushinak I was a result of confusion with the Akkadian word nannaru, "light," "lamp" or "illuminator," which could serve as an epithet of the god. A similar divine name known from Mari and Khana, Nanni, is grammatically feminine and more likely to be connected with Nanaya than Nanna.

The Akkadian moon god, Su'en or Sin, was in origin a separate deity from Sumerian Nanna, but they were already identified with each other in the texts from Ebla. The etymology of his name is unknown, much like that of Nanna’s. It was often spelled as DEN.ZU (simplified to just DZU) or with the numeral 30, ( DXXX). In an Akkadian text from Ugarit written in the local alphabetic script the name was spelled as Sn. In Aramaic texts the spellings Sn, Šn and Syn are attested. The name is not connected with that of the god S(y)n from Hadhramaut, who had solar, rather than lunar, character.

Another name of the moon god was Dilimbabbar, formerly read as Ašimbabbar, attested for the first time in the Early Dynastic god list from Fara (Shuruppak). In zami hymns from the same period, it was specifically associated with the moon god worshiped in the city of Urum.

The epithets lugal (king) and a-a (father) were commonly applied to the moon god. In the god list An = Anum he is also referred as dUkkin, literally “the assembly,” possibly in connection with his occasional role as the head of the pantheon, presiding over the divine assembly.

Functions and iconography
In all periods of Mesopotamian history, the moon god was regarded as a major deity.  In Ur, he was imagined as the divine ruler of the city, and as a result had a prominent role in the local royal ideology. Other places where he played a particularly important role include Harran and the Diyala area.

Nanna was also associated with cattle and with dairy products.  He was frequently described as a shepherd. The astral deity and divine herdsman images were not incompatible, and references to stars as representation of his herd are known.

Much like his son Utu/Shamash, Nanna/Sin could be regarded as a divine judge, and references to him passing judgments alongside the sun god are known for example from Old Babylonian inscriptions.

The lunar crescent was the primary symbol of the moon god in Mesopotamia. It was frequently compared to bull horns and to a barge.  While well attested in art and in texts, the barge of the moon god does not appear to play a major role in any known myths.

In art Nanna was sometimes depicted alongside his wife Ningal, for example banqueting with her. On the stele of Ur-Nammu Ningal sits in Nanna’s lap. This type of depictions was meant to display the intimate nature of a connection between the deities and highlight their ability to act in unison, and is also attested for Bau and Ningirsu.

As head of the pantheon
A number of sources attest the existence of a tradition in which Nanna was regarded as the head of the pantheon, or was equal in rank to its traditional heads Anu and Enlil.

An Old Babylonian composition, written in Sumerian, presents Nanna as the head of the divine assembly (Ubšu’ukkin), with Anu, Enlil, Inanna, Utu, Enki and Ninhursag serving as his advisers.

Some Old Babylonian theophoric personal names might be connected to the view that Sin was the head of the pantheon, including Sin-bel-ili ("Sin is the lord of the gods"), Sin-shar-ili ("Sin is the king of the gods") or Sin-il-ili ("Sin is god of the gods"). Wilfred G. Lambert notes that while similar names are attested with other gods as the theophoric element (for example Shamash and Adad), Sin-bel-ili is the most common of the names of this type. He nonetheless notes that most evidence for the existence of a Sin-centric theology is dated to the reign of Meli-Shipak II or later.

The view that Sin was the supreme god  was particularly enthusiastically supported by the last neo-Babylonian king, Nabonidus. One of his inscriptions from Harran, according to Lambert most likely a city where the view that Sin was the head of the pantheon was widespread, refers to him as "lord of the gods" who possessed "Enlilship," "Anuship" and "Eaship."

Nanna and other lunar gods of the ancient Near East

Like Nanna/Suen, other gods of the ancient Near East were predominantly male, unlike Selene known from later Greek beliefs.

Sanugaru or Shangar was a god worshiped in Ebla, Mari, Tell al-Rimah, and Mane whose character is often assumed to be lunar and whose name is possibly sometimes represented by the logogram dEN.ZU in Eblaite documents. Piotr Taracha notes that his association with Ishara might be considered evidence too, as she appears frequently alongside moon gods in sources from ancient Syria and Anatolia.  It is possible that in Ebla he only represented a specific phase of the moon. A similar named, likely analogous, god - Shaggara or Shangara - is attested from Emar as well. It has been proposed that the god NI-da-KUL (Hadabal) from Ebla had a lunar character too, as his cult center Arugadu or Larugadu might be the same place as Lrgt from Ugaritic texts, known to be a cult center of the moon god Yarikh in later times. However, as noted by Alfonso Archi, there is no guarantee that Eblaite and Amorite gods of the same location were necessarily analogous.

In many ancient Semitic languages, such as Amorite and Ugaritic, the moon god's name was Yariḫ (Yarikh), Yarḫ or another cognate. It was derived from a term referring both to the moon and to month. While neither the names Nanna nor Suen share such a linguistic affinity, the respective Sumerian (itud) and Akkadian (warḫum) words for moon and month are likewise the same. Steve A. Wiggins notes that Yarikh shows a number of associations distinct from Nanna, for example literary texts at times compare him to a dog, an animal not associated with the Mesopotamian moon god. The two of them are nonetheless equated in an Ugaritic god list. As noted by Nick Wyatt, Nikkal, regarded as the wife of Yarikh in Ugarit, likely reached the coastal city via a Hurrian intermediary, and it is possible that the myth describing their marriage was based on a Sumerian or Hurian original and its original protagonist was Kusuh or Nanna.

Hurrians referred to the moon god as Kusuh, Umbu (a name possibly adopted by them from Upper Mesopotamia) and Ushu (Ušu). The Hurrian moon god was identified with Sin and his name was sometimes written logographically as dEN.ZU or dXXX. It is possible that his character was influenced by exposure to Mesopotamian culture and the image of the moon god in it in particular.

In Hittite and Luwian sources the logographic writings dXXX  and dEN.ZU were used to render the name of the Anatolian moon god Arma. As noted by hittitologist Piotr Taracha, while dXXX was also used to represent the name of the Hattian moon god Kashku (Kašku) in a Hattian version of the myth The Moon that Fell from Heaven, it is improbable that it designates him in cultic texts, as he was a deity of little relevance in Hattian and Hittite religion.

In Elam, the logogram dXXX was also used to represent the name of the moon god, which might be either Nannar (spelled syllabically in at least one Elamite source), derived from Nanna, or Napir (not to be confused with Napirisha).

A Kassite-Akkadian vocabulary explains the Kassite god Ši-ḪU (reading uncertain) as Sin, but other sources instead seem to equate him with Marduk.

Family and court
Enlil and Ninlil were usually regarded as Nanna’s parents.  While references to Anu as his father are also known, they are most likely metaphorical. In the god list An = Anum Suzianna and Ninimma, both of them regarded as courtiers of Enlil, were described as Nanna’s nurse independently from each other.

In the myth Enlil and Ninlil his brothers are Nergal, Ninazu and Enbilulu, though the latter two gods were commonly regarded as sons of different parents instead. Nergal and Nanna were sometimes referred to as the "big twins," identified with Lugal-irra and Meslamta-ea.

Nanna’s wife was Ningal (spelled Nikkal in Akkadian). Derivatives of her were present as wife of the local moon gods in the Ugaritic, Hurrian and Hittite pantheons.

Their most notable children were Inanna/Ishtar, representing the morning star, and Utu/Shamash, representing the sun. The view that Inanna was a daughter of Nanna and Ningal is the most commonly attested tradition regarding her parentage.

Due to her identification with Inanna/Ishtar, the Hurrian and Elamite goddess Pinikir is referred to as a daughter of Sin and Ningal in a text written in Akkadian but found in a corpus of Hurro-Hittite rituals. Another deity associated with Ishtar who was sometimes described as daughter of Sin was the love goddess Nanaya, though Anu or Urash (the male tutelary god of Dilbat, rather than the earth goddess of the same name) could be described as her fathers too.

Further relatively commonly attested children of Nanna-Suen and Ningal include the goddesses Amarra-uzu and Amarra-he'ea, known from the god list An = Anum, Ningublaga (the city god of Kiabrig) and  Numushda (the city god of Kazallu).

Ningublaga was a god of cattle, and his association with the moon god is well attested in god lists (An = Anum, the Weidner list, the Nippur list) and other sources, one example being the formula "servant of Sin and Ningublaga," known from an Old Babylonian cylinder seal. However, he was not always explicitly identified as his son.  Direct evidence is absent from the god list An = Anum, but can be found in an inscription of Abisare of Larsa and in a hymn from Ningublaga's temple in Kiabrig.

Numushda was regarded as a god of wild nature, though he could also be associated with storms (and by extension with the weather god Ishkur) and flooding. Designating him as a son of Nanna/Suen was likely meant to be a way to assimilate him into the pantheon of southern Mesopotamia, and might be based on perceived similarity to Ningublaga. This tradition is absent from sources from the third millennium BCE. Additionally, a single source calls Numushda a son of Enki, rather than Nanna and Ningal.

In a single Maqlû incantation, Manzat (Akkadian and Elamite goddess of the rainbow) appears as the sister of Shamash, and by extension as daughter of his parents, Sin and Ningal.

A tradition according to which Ninazu was a son (rather than brother, like in Enlil and Ninlil) of Nanna is also known. Frans Wiggermann proposes that the occasional association between these two deities might have reflected the dependence of Enegi, Ninazu’s cult city, on nearby Ur.

In Harran in the first millennium BCE Nuska, normally associated with Enlil, was the son of Sin instead, possibly as a result of influence of a presently unknown Aramaic tradition. Earlier Nuska was also sometimes regarded as the son of the ancestral god pairs Enki-Ninki (distinct from the god Enki) or Enul-Ninul.

As an extension of her marriage to the sun god, the dawn goddess Aya was regarded as a daughter in law of Nanna, and one of her common epithets was kallatum, which can be translated as either “bride” or “daughter in law.”

Nanna’s sukkal (attendant deity) was Alammuš, who according to Manfred Krebernik might have been regarded as his son at some point in time. Alammush and Ningublaga were often associated with each other and could be even referred to as brothers (for example in the god list  An = Anum, which does not identify either of them as Nanna's sons). Alammuš himself, as well as Ningal, also had their own sukkals who formed a part of the court of Nanna, though the reading of their names is presently impossible to determine with certainty.

The minor goddess Nimintabba is attested as a member of the entourage of Nanna.

Worship

Ur was already well established as a center of the cult of the moon god under his Sumerian name Nanna in Early Dynastic times, as attested in the zami hymns from Abu Salabikh. His primary temple in that city was Ekishnugal, rebuilt or otherwise patronized by multiple kings, including Naram-Sin of Akkad, Ur-Namma of Ur, various rulers from the Isin-Larsa period, Kurigalzu I of the Kassite dynasty of Babylon, Marduk-nadin-ahhe and Adad-apla-iddina of the second dynasty of Isin, and Nebuchadnezzar II of the Neo-Babylonian Empire. Other houses of worship dedicated to him existed in Ur too, for example Edublamah ("house, exalted door socket"), originally a court of law, rebuilt as a temple by Kurigalzu I, and a ziggurat, Elugalgalgasisa, "house of the king who lets counsel flourish."

An important aspect of Nanna’s cult in Ur was the institution of the en priestess, who were daughters of kings. A number of cultic songs dedicated to Nanna mention them, sometimes by name. Their residence was known as Gipar. In the Old Babylonian period it was combined into a single complex with the temple of Nanna’s wife Ningal. Sargon’s daughter Enheduanna was a particularly famous en pritestess.  Some of the later en pritesesses known from records include Enmenana, daughter of Sargon’s grandson Naram-Sin of Akkad;  Enanatuma, daughter of Ishme-Dagan of Isin; and Enanedu, sister of Rim-Sin of Larsa. While prominent in the third and early second millennium, the institution of en priestess seemingly declined and finally disappeared in later periods, with a brief revival during the reign of the last neo-Babylonian king, Nabonidus, who  showed great interest in Ur. He revived the institution of the en priestess, likely relying on inscriptions from the reign of Rim-Sin of Larsa, and placed his daughter in this role. She received a new name, Ennigaldi-Nanna ("priestess requested by Nanna"), which was based on Sumerian names of her distant predecessors. Paul-Alain Bealieu notes that Nabonidus’ investigation of the nature of the office of en priestess in the previous periods of Mesopotamian history can be compared to a degree to the work of a modern archeologist.

Other cult centers of Mesopotamian moon god included Tutub (where he had an en priestess like in Ur), Urum (attested in Abu Salabikh zami hymns) and Ga’esh (located near Ur). In Akshak Sin was the city god, and in at least one instance (a theophoric personal name) he was referred to as "Lugal-Akshak." He is also the most commonly occurring god in personal names known from tablets from the Chogha Gavaneh site in western Iran, which in the early second millennium BCE was an Akkadian settlement most likely connected to the kingdom of Eshnunna.

In Upper Mesopotamia Sin was primarily the god of Harran. His temple there was Ehulhul (𒂍𒄾𒄾 e2-ḫul2-ḫul2), "house which gives joy," which existed at least since the Old Babylonian period and continued to be patronized by both neo-Assyrian (Shalmaneser II, Ashurbanipal) and neo-Babylonian (Nabonidus) kings in later periods. In the late Bronze Age the moon god of Harran was also worshiped by the rulers of the Mitanni empire and by other Hurrians, as well as Luwians, and is mentioned in sources from as far west as Tarḫuntašša.

Nerab (modern Al-Nayrab) located near modern Aleppo, served as an Aramaic cult site of the moon god in the first millennium BCE.  Additionally, the Syrian city Kurda was the cult center of Shangar and Lrgd presumably located near Ugarit - of Yarikh.

Temples of Nanna-Suen also existed in major cities of Babylonia such as Uruk, Nippur and Babylon. The temples in Babylon and in Bit-Suenna near Nippur both bore the name Ekishnugal, much like the main temple in Ur, while the Uruk temple was known as Edumununna, "house of the son of the prince." In Nippur Nanna was also worshiped in one of the four chapels in the temple of Ninlil, with the other 3 belonging to Ninhursag, Nintinugga and Nisaba.

In Assyria there was a joint temple of Sin and Shamash in Assur, known as Ehulhuldirdirra, "house of surpassing joys," which was rebuilt by Ashur-nirari I, Tukulti-Ninurta I and Ashurnasirpal II. A similar joint temple existed in Nineveh, as indicated in documents from the reign of Esarhaddon, though its name is presently unknown. The moon god, under the name Sin, was also frequently invoked by the inhabitants of the Old Assyrian trading colony (karum) in Kanesh.

Evidence for worship of Nanna-Suen is also present in various royal inscriptions. Ibbi-Sin, one of the kings of the Third Dynasty of Ur, dedicated the image of a "red dog of Meluhha" to Nanna. According to the document describing this offering, the animal bore the evocative name "He bites!" Kudur-Mabuk of Larsa left behind an inscription which he describes Nanna as "the reliable god." In a curse formula from the reign of either Kurigalzu I and Kurigalzu II which according to Wilfred G. Lambert reflects "the religious outlook of Der" Nanna appears behind Anu, Enlil and Enki.

Mythology
A number of compositions deal with the relationship between the moon god and his parents. In a fragmentary text, Enlil presides over Nanna’s and Ningal’s wedding. In Nanna-Suen’s journey to Nibru, Nanna visits his father in Nippur. In a fragmentary uadi song, Nanna’s status is seemingly described as bestowed upon him by Ninlil. Another tradition, attested in a text from Gungunum’s reign, Nanna’s light was bestowed upon him by the so-called "Enki-Ninki deities," a class of ancestral beings from various Mesopotamian theogonies. The motif of gods receiving their domains from them is present in other compositions: in one text they bestow mastery over waters on Enki (the god Enki and the divine ancestor Enki are two distinct figures), while in another they give something (poor state of preservation of the tablet does not allow precise identification) to Enlil.

Sin appears in a prominent role in the Labbu myth, which alongside the presence of the god Tishpak from Eshnunna makes it possible to conclude it originated in the Diyala area, where he was a particularly major deity.

As noted by Nathan Wasserman, various mythological compositions portray Nanna as a god who “enjoys river-side fishing.”

Nanna appears in a fragmentary text seemingly describing visits of the fire god Gibil in various major temples.

In the Enuma Elish the moon god, referred to with the name Nannar, is appointed to his position by Marduk after the defeat of Tiamat.

Later relevance

Harran retained importance as a religious site after the fall of the Neo-Babylonian Empire through the Persian, Hellenistic and Roman periods. However, Greek and Roman authors, as well as later Arabic ones, often incorrectly described the central deity of Harran as female. For example, Herodian assumed the city was a cult center of Selene, while Ammianus Marcellinus refers to Luna in Harran. The author of Historia Augusta is a notable exception, referring to the god of Harran as a male deity, "Lunus." In Arabic sources the inhabitants of Harran were described as pagan "Sabians" but there are too few reliable accounts of their beliefs to determine to what degree they were a continuation of the cult of Sin known from earlier periods. Many rituals and deities from late accounts of Harranian religion do not appear to have clear forerunners in earlier sources.

In Mandaean cosmology, the name for the moon is Sin, which is derived from the name of the Mesopotamian deity, much like the Mandean names of many other celestial bodies.

References

Bibliography

External links

Ancient Mesopotamian Gods and Goddesses: Nanna/Suen/Sin (god)
Narratives featuring Nanna-Suen in the Electronic Text Corpus of Sumerian Literature
Hymns addressed to Nanna in the Electronic Text Corpus of Sumerian Literature

Lunar gods
Mesopotamian gods
Ur
Harran